Brian Aldridge (born May 6, 1977) is an American Republican politician. He served as member of the Mississippi House of Representatives from the 17th District from 2004 to 2016. He decided not to run for reelection in 2015.

References

1977 births
Living people
Politicians from Tupelo, Mississippi
Republican Party members of the Mississippi House of Representatives
Mississippi State University alumni
21st-century American politicians